Ian Chandler (born 3 August 1951) is an Australian former cyclist. He competed in the team time trial event at the 1976 Summer Olympics.

References

External links
 

1951 births
Living people
Australian male cyclists
Olympic cyclists of Australia
Cyclists at the 1976 Summer Olympics
Cyclists from Melbourne